Félix Ángel Sancho Gracia (27 September 1936 – 8 August 2012) was a Spanish motion picture and television actor.

Career

Born in Madrid, Gracia started his acting career in Montevideo, Uruguay, where he lived from 1947 until 1961. In Montevideo he was a student of Margarita Xirgu. He made his movie acting debut in France in the 1963 film L'Autre femme opposite Annie Girardot. Since then he has appeared in more than eighty motion pictures including several Hollywood productions during the 1970s and in 1999's Outlaw Justice with Willie Nelson and Kris Kristofferson. Gracia also worked in Australia, performing as a regular cast member in the 1982 television series, Runaway Island and in the 1991 made-for-TV film, Pirates Island. He also participated in the Oscar-nominated Mexican film The Crime of Padre Amaro (2002).

In 2003, he was nominated for the Goya Award for Best Actor for his performance in the 2002 film 800 Bullets.

In addition to motion pictures, Sancho Gracia made more than sixty guest appearances on Spanish television shows. He became famous in Spain for the role of Curro Jiménez, in the Televisión Española drama series of the same name, that was broadcast from 1976 to 1979, being rebroadcast several times since then.

Personal life

In 1969, Sancho Gracia married Noelia Aguirre Gomensoro, the daughter of an Uruguayan National Party politician, whom with he had three children, including Rodolfo. During the shooting of the film 100 Rifles in Spain in 1968, Gracia had an affair with American actress Raquel Welch, who at the time was married to producer Patrick Curtis. Welch's husband, upon finding out about the affair, chased Gracia at gunpoint through the hotel where they were staying in Aguadulce.

He died of lung cancer on 8 August 2012 in Madrid.

Selected filmography
 Vampiresas 1930 (1962) - Negra de la orquesta
 A Nearly Decent Girl (1963) - Amigote de Carlos
 L'autre femme (1964)
 Murieta (1965) - Bandido de Murrieta (uncredited)
 El Zorro cabalga otra vez (1965) - Juan
 Sheriff Won't Shoot (1965) - Sam, Handsome Bandit
 In a Colt's Shadow (1965) - Saloon Gunslinger (uncredited)
 Operation Poker (1965) - John Parker
 La ciudad no es para mí (1966) - Dr. Ricardo Torres
 He's My Man! (1966) - Jefe banda Sing-Sing
 Los duendes de Andalucía (1966) - Simon Legrand
 Per il gusto di uccidere (1966) - Bill Kilpatrick
 Las viudas (1966) - Joven seductor (segment "El Aniversario")
 Fray Torero (1966) - Antonio
 Road to Rocío (1966) - Médico
 Savage Pampas (1966) - Carlos
 Espi... ando (1966)
 ¿Qué hacemos con los hijos? (1967) - José
 Django Kill... If You Live, Shoot! (1967) - Willy
 Club de solteros (1967) - Tomás
 Run Like a Thief (1967) - Wes
 The House of 1,000 Dolls (1967) - Fernando
 La chica de los anuncios (1968) - Teddy
 100 Rifles (1969) - Mexican Leader (uncredited)
 Guns of the Magnificent Seven (1969) - Miguel
 Simón Bolívar (1969) - Cardona
 El último día de la guerra (1970) - Pvt. Martínez
 Rain for a Dusty Summer (1971) - Humberto Pro
 Antony and Cleopatra (1972) - Canidius
 The Call of the Wild (1972) - Taglish Charlie
 El espectro del terror (1973) - Doctor
 Dick Turpin (1974) - Richard
 País S.A. (1975) - Actores invitados
 Guerreras verdes (1976) - Sargento Saez
 Avisa a Curro Jiménez (1978) - Curro Jiménez
 Él y él (1980) - Alberto
 Marbella, un golpe de cinco estrellas (1985) - Police Inspector Vargas
 The Witching Hour (1985) - Rubén Blázquez y Delgado de Aguilera
 De tripas corazón (1985) - Arturo
 Freckled Max and the Spooks (1987) - Prokurator
 Gallego (1988)
 Love, Hate and Death (1989) - Antonio Montoya
 Tango (1991) - Marcos
 Huidos (1993) - Juan
 Tocando fondo (1993) - Bartolo
 Cachito (1996) - Rafael
 Martín (hache) (1997) - José M.ª Navarro
 The Naked Eye (1998) - Ignacio
 Dying of Laughter (1999) - Legionario brutal
 Inferno (1999) - Muñoz
 A galope tendido (2000) - Tío Boni
 La comunidad (2000) - Castro
 No te fallaré (2001) - Sandro
 ¡Hasta aquí hemos llegado! (2002) - Lago
 The Crime of Father Amaro (2002) - Padre Benito Díaz
 Box 507 (2002) - Santos Guijuelo
 El robo más grande jamás contado (2002) - Fernando Baeza "Garganta Profunda"
 800 Bullets (2002) - Julián
 El oro de Moscú (2003) - Teniente de la Guardia Civil
 El furgón (2003) - El Manco
 El Cid: The Legend (2003) - Gormaz (voice)
 Love by Mistake (2004) - Manolo
 Mala uva (2004) - César
 R2 y el caso del cadáver sin cabeza (2005) - Inspector jefe
 Bailando chachacha (2005)
 La bicicleta (2006) - Mario
 Los mánagers (2006) - Josete
 Donkey Xote (2007) - Sansón Carrasco / Siniestro (voice)
 Barreiros, motor humano (2008) - (voice)
 7 pasos y medio (2009) - Antonio
 The Last Circus (2010) - Coronel Salcedo
 Entrelobos (2010) - Atanasio

References

External links

1936 births
2012 deaths
Spanish male film actors
Spanish male television actors
Male Spaghetti Western actors
Spanish emigrants to Uruguay
20th-century Spanish male actors
21st-century Spanish male actors